The 2005 San Jose Earthquakes season was the tenth season of the team's existence and last before their move to Houston to become the Houston Dynamo. The season also marked the franchise's first Supporters' Shield.

About

2004 was a disappointment after a strong finish to the 2003 season ending with a championship. Second year head coach Dominic Kinnear and assistant coach John Doyle hoped to return the Quakes back to the winning tradition in 2005. It was marked as the first year of the new generation for the Quakes after losing 9 key players in the off season from 2004-2005, and with the new roster expansion bringing in 18 players for the new season. The Earthquakes set a league record with an 18-4-10 record with 64 points on the year. They became the first MLS team to go undefeated at home during the regular season. 

Change over from the 2004 team, key players lost in the off season, Ramiro Corrales and Landon Donovan left the squad in the off season to play abroad. Donovan would pull a swerve and return to MLS a short time later with rival Los Angeles Galaxy. A trade was set up to be in place with the Galaxy to obtain Carlos Ruiz but a deal was never reached. Ronnie Ekelund failed to resign, after both sides couldn't come to terms. Jamil Walker was picked up in the expansion draft by Chivas USA. Arturo Alvarez was traded to Dallas Burn for Brad Davis. Captain Jeff Agoos was traded to the Metrostars for Ricardo Clark and a draft pick. Chris Roner was lost due to injury and never returned, his rights were retained. Chris Brown was lost to Real Salt Lake in the expansion draft. Leighton o'brien player rights were traded to Real Salt Lake. Steve Cronin and Todd Dunivant were traded to the Galaxy for Aloisi and Claiff. 

The first move Kinnear and Doyle made were bringing back veterans Wade Barrett and all time leader goal-scorer Ronald Cerritos were brought back into the team to add veteran leadership. They drafted key players Danny O'Rourke, Kevin Goldthwaite, future MLS Scoring Champion Chris Wondolowski, Robbie Fulton, Orlando Ramirez, Aaron Lanes, James Twellman and Brett Rodriguez. Wondolowski was the reserve league scoring champion during that season. Brad Davis, Ricardo Clark, Chris Aloisi, Kelly Gray, Mark Chung, Julian Nash, Alejandro Moreno, and Danny Califf were obtained through trades. 

May 18th, 2005 the Quakes would lose veteran and leader Troy Dayak to an injury that would force Dayak to announce his retirement at the end of the regular season. It made way for Danny Califf to step in and become one of the center back pairings in MLS history with Eddie Robinson. Veteran right back Craig Waibel was also lost to an injury in early June who was playing some of the best soccer of his career to a torn MCL and ACL. A trade was made with the Chicago Fire to bring in San Jose native Kelly Gray to challenge Chris Aloisi for the starting job. He eventually won and took it. Mark Chung was acquired when a rash of injures of happened when Ian Russell, Brad Davis, Brian Mullan spent time on the injury list in June and July. 

Robinson, Califf both found January National Team call ups after a successful season, along with Brad Davis, Brian Mullan, Brian Ching, Wade Barrett, Kelly Gray and Ricardo Clark.
Doyle lead the Reserve Team to a Championship its first year.

Chung announced his retirement from the Earthquake after coming to the mid-season via trade with the Colorado Rapids and contributing heavily to the ultimate success with the team. He opted out of moving along with the team to Houston Dyanmo after the 2005 season. 

Ian Russell, Mark Chung, Jon Conway, Troy Dayak didn't move with the team to Houston. Russell was traded to Los Angeles, Conway to New York, Chung and Dayak retired. Danny Califf opted to try his luck in Europe.

Squad

Current squad 
As of August 18, 2009.

Club

Management

Other information

Competitions

Major League Soccer

Matches

MLS Cup Playoffs

U.S. Open Cup

Source:

Standings

References

External links
San Jose Earthquakes season stats | sjearthquakes.com
San Jose Earthquakes Game Results | Soccerstats.us

2005
San Jose Earthquakes
San Jose Earthquakes
San Jose Earthquakes
2005